Wilfred Harold "Gizzy" Hart (June 1, 1901 — June 22, 1964) was a Canadian ice hockey player who played 99 games in the National Hockey League with the Detroit Cougars and Montreal Canadiens between 1926 and 1933. Prior to the NHL he played in the Pacific Coast Hockey Association and Western Canada Hockey League for the Victoria Cougars between 1923 and 1926, winning the Stanley Cup in 1925. Hart was born in Brandon, Manitoba, but grew up in Weyburn, Saskatchewan.

He was short and stocky but a fast skater. He was also a talented baseball player and a track star.

Career statistics

Regular season and playoffs

References

External links
 
 

1901 births
1964 deaths
Canadian ice hockey left wingers
Detroit Cougars players
Ice hockey people from Saskatchewan
Montreal Canadiens players
Providence Reds players
Sportspeople from Weyburn
Stanley Cup champions
Victoria Cougars (1911–1926) players
Windsor Bulldogs (CPHL) players